Joel Theodore Stransky (born 16 July 1967) is a South African former rugby union player. A fly-half, he is known for scoring all of South Africa's points, including the winning drop goal, against New Zealand in the 1995 Rugby World Cup final.

Early life
Stransky was born in Pietermaritzburg, South Africa, to a family from England and Czechia. He was raised in Reform Judaism and had a Bar Mitzvah ceremony. He was educated at Maritzburg College where he was coached by Skonk Nicholson, a well-known figure in schoolboy rugby. After his military conscription in Pretoria, he returned to Natal to study at the University of Natal.

Playing career
In 1990 he was part of the  team that beat Northern Transvaal to win the Currie Cup for the first time. He then moved to Italy where he played for L'Aquila during the 1991–1992 season, and for San Donà in 1992–93. Between 1993 and 1996, he won 22 caps for his South Africa.

In 1995 he was part of the first South Africa team to play in a Rugby World Cup - the country had been banned from the previous World Cups because of the Apartheid regime. He played an integral part in the tournament and scored all the points for his team in the final against New Zealand, including a winning drop goal in the second period of extra time. This was the first Rugby World Cup final that went into extra time.

In 1997, he moved to Leicester Tigers, where he played for two seasons, winning the 1996–97 Pilkington Cup and the 1998–99 Allied Dunbar Premiership, and then became backs coach.

In the buildup to the 1999 Rugby World Cup, it was suggested that Stransky could play for England, but he discovered that he was not qualified to do so.

In 2002, he was engaged by Bristol Rugby as a coach, but the offer was subsequently withdrawn. Stransky took legal action and was compensated.

Test history 
 World Cup Final

Later career
He later returned to South Africa, and is a part-time rugby union television commentator.

In January 2007, Stransky joined Altech Netstar (Pty) Ltd. as Sales & Marketing director. In January 2008, he was appointed managing director, but subsequently resigned. He was then employed by the Steinhoff Group in a marketing and promotional capacity. He founded Pivotal Capital in 2012.

In film
In the 2009 movie Invictus, he is portrayed by Scott Eastwood.

See also
List of select Jewish rugby union players
List of South Africa national rugby union players – Springbok no. 592

References

External links 
 
 Sporting heroes
 Altech Netstar homepage
 Joel Stranksy bio at Jewish Sports Hall of Fame
 Joel Stransky bio at Jewsinsports.com
 Book review: The Glory of the Game, about the Ten Jewish Springboks.

1967 births
Living people
Alumni of Maritzburg College
Alumni of Rondebosch Boys' High School
Jewish rugby union players
Jewish South African sportspeople
Leicester Tigers coaches
Leicester Tigers players
Rugby union fly-halves
Rugby union players from Pietermaritzburg
Sharks (Currie Cup) players
South Africa international rugby union players
South African people of Czech descent
South African people of English descent
South African people of Jewish descent
South African rugby union players
Villager FC players
Western Province (rugby union) players
White South African people